Ivan Ageyev (born April 8, 1990) is a Russian professional ice hockey goaltender. He is currently playing with CSKA Moscow of the Kontinental Hockey League (KHL).

References

External links

Living people
1990 births
Russian ice hockey goaltenders